Caaporã is a municipality in the state of Paraíba in the Northeast Region of Brazil.

The municipality contains a small part of the  Acaú-Goiana Extractive Reserve, a sustainable use conservation unit created in 2007.

See also
List of municipalities in Paraíba

References

Municipalities in Paraíba